Sara Lee Ellis (born December 8, 1969) is a United States district judge of the United States District Court for the Northern District of Illinois.

Early life

Ellis was born December 8, 1969, in London, Ontario, Canada, to Jamaican-born parents. She became a naturalized citizen of the United States when she was 15 years old.

Education and career
She received a Bachelor of Arts degree in 1991 from Indiana University. She received a Juris Doctor in 1994 from Loyola University Chicago School of Law. She worked as a staff attorney at the Federal Defender Program in Chicago from 1994 to 1999. From 2000 to 2004, she worked at Stetler, Duffy & Rotert, Ltd., a white-collar criminal defense law firm. From 2004 to 2008, she served as Assistant Corporation Counsel for the City of Chicago Department of Law, handling claims for injunctive relief and civil rights lawsuits. From 2008 to 2013, she served as counsel at the law firm of Schiff Hardin LLP in Chicago, where she was a member of the litigation and white-collar crime practice groups.

Federal judicial service

On May 6, 2013, President Barack Obama nominated Ellis to be a United States District Judge of the United States District Court for the Northern District of Illinois, to the seat vacated by Judge Joan B. Gottschall, who assumed senior status on April 23, 2012. She received a hearing before the Senate Judiciary Committee on June 19, 2013, and her nomination was reported to the floor of the Senate on July 18, 2013, by voice vote. The Senate confirmed her nomination on October 7, 2013, by voice vote. She received her commission on October 8, 2013.

See also 
 List of African-American federal judges
 List of African-American jurists

References

External links

1969 births
Living people
African-American judges
Illinois lawyers
Indiana University alumni
Judges of the United States District Court for the Northern District of Illinois
Loyola University Chicago School of Law alumni
People from London, Ontario
Public defenders
United States district court judges appointed by Barack Obama
21st-century American judges
American people of Jamaican descent
Canadian emigrants to the United States
21st-century American women judges